This is the list of notable stars in the constellation Libra, sorted by decreasing brightness.

See also
List of stars by constellation
Color=Blue

References

List
Libra